The Willcox Unified School District is the school district for Willcox, Arizona and the surrounding areas. It operates an elementary school, a middle school, and Willcox High School.

References

External links
 

School districts in Cochise County, Arizona